This is a list of universities in the United States that sponsored basketball but have discontinued their programs. The last year they sponsored basketball is included.

Last season played in parentheses, categorized by the calendar year in which the last season ended.

 NCAA Division I
 Alliant International University, formerly United States International University (1991)
 University of Baltimore (1983)
 Morris Brown College (2003)
 Northeastern Illinois University (1997)
 University of Texas–Pan American (2015) – The UTPA athletic program was merged with the NAIA program of University of Texas at Brownsville, creating a single Division I program that now competes as the UTRGV Vaqueros.
 NCAA Division II
 Armstrong State University (2017)
 Brigham Young University–Hawaii (2017)
 Concordia College (New York, 2021)
 Concordia University–Portland (2020)
 Dowling College (2016)
 Holy Names University (2023)
 Knoxville College (1990)
 LIU Post (2019) – The LIU Post athletic program was merged with the Division I program of LIU Brooklyn, creating a single Division I program that now competes as the LIU Sharks.
 Notre Dame de Namur University (2020)
 Saint Joseph's College (Indiana, 2017)
 Saint Paul's College (Virginia, 2011)
 Stony Brook Southampton, formerly LIU's Southampton College (2005)
 Urbana University (2020)
 University of the Sciences (USciences, 2022) – Merged into Division I's Saint Joseph's University.
 NCAA Division III
 Becker College (2021)
 Bishop College (1988)
 Boston State College (1982)
 Cazenovia College (2023)
 Daniel Webster College (2017)
 Finlandia University (2023)
 Johnson & Wales University (Denver, 2020)
 Lowell State College (1975)
 MacMurray College (2020)
 MCPHS University, formerly Massachusetts College of Pharmacy and Health Sciences (1999)
 Mills College (2022)
 Milton College (1982)
 Mount Ida College (2018)
 National Louis University (late 1990s)
 Newbury College (Massachusetts, 2019)
 New York City College of Technology (2011)
 NYU Poly (2014) – Historically known as the Polytechnic Institute of New York and later Polytechnic University, it merged with New York University in 2008, becoming the Polytechnic Institute of New York University. NYU Poly merged completely into NYU in 2014, becoming the NYU engineering school, with Poly's athletic program being absorbed by NYU's.
 Parks College (1996)
 Pillsbury Baptist Bible College (2008)
 Pine Manor College (2021) – Absorbed into Division I's Boston College.
 Sage College of Albany (2020) – Merged with formerly all-female Russell Sage College, which became co-educational, after The Sage Colleges renamed as Russell Sage.
 St. Francis de Sales College (Wisconsin, 1977)
 Southern Vermont College (2019)
 Spelman College (2013) – Spelman is a women's college.
 Upsala College (1995)
 Wesley College (Delaware, 2021) – Acquired by Division I's Delaware State University.
 Wheelock College (2018)
 NCAA College Division
 Parsons College (1973)
 NAIA
 AIB College of Business (2015)
 Alaska Pacific University (1990)
 University of Albuquerque (1969) – Also competed in NCAA College Division starting in 1966.
 Ashford University (2016)
 University of Alaska Southeast (1990)
 Barat College (2001)
 Bethany University (2011)
 Benedictine University at Springfield (2015)
 Cascade College (2009)
 Cincinnati Christian University (2019)
 Concordia Senior College (1977)
 Dana College (2010)
 Detroit Institute of Technology (1980)
 DeVry University, formerly DeVry Institute of Technology (Atlanta, Georgia, 1992)
 Dr. Martin Luther College (1995) – Incorporated Northwestern College and became Martin Luther College.
 College of Emporia (1974)
 George Williams College (Chicago, 1985) – Merged with Aurora University in 2000.
 Green Mountain College (2019)
 Holy Family College (Wisconsin, 2020)
 Johnson & Wales University (Florida, 2020)
 Huron University, also known as Si Tanka University–Huron (2005)
 Kendall College (mid-2000s)
 Lambuth University (2011)
 Lindenwood University – Belleville (2020)
 Marycrest International University (2002)
 Marygrove College (2018)
 Mid-Continent University (2014)
 Mount Senario College (2001)
 Mountain State University (2012)
 Mundelein College (1991) – Incorporated into NCAA Division I's Loyola University Chicago.
 Northwestern College (Wisconsin, 1995) – Merged with Dr. Martin Luther College; see above.
 New College of California (1994)
 Northwood University (Florida, 2015) – Sold to Keiser University.
 Northwood University (Texas, 2013)
 Patten University (2005)
 Phillips University (1998)
 Presentation College (2023)
 Purdue University Calumet (2017) – Merged with Purdue North Central to become Purdue University Northwest.
 Purdue University North Central (2017) – Merged with Purdue Calumet to become Purdue Northwest.
 Robert Morris University Chicago (2020) – Merged into Roosevelt University.
 St. Catharine College (2016)
 St. Gregory's University (2017)
 St. Mary of the Plains College (1992)
 Santa Fe University of Art and Design, formerly College of Santa Fe and St. Michael's College (1986)
 Sheldon Jackson College (1992)
 University of South Dakota–Springfield (1984)
 Southern Benedictine College, formerly Saint Bernard College (1979)
 Southern Polytechnic State University (2014)
 Tarkio College (1992)
 University of Texas at Brownsville (2015) – Merged with the NCAA Division I athletic program of University of Texas–Pan American; see above.
 Trinity International University (2023)
 Trinity Lutheran College (Washington, 2016)
 Victory University, formerly Crichton College (2014)
 Virginia Intermont College (2014)
 Westmar College (1997)
 Yankton College (1984)
 NCCAA
 Central Bible College (2013)
 Grace University (2018)
 Hiwassee College (2019)
 John Wesley University (2018)
 Tennessee Temple University (2015)
 USCAA
 Concordia College Alabama (2018)
 College of New Rochelle (2019) – Also competed in NCAA Division III.
 Robert Morris University Springfield (2019)
 College of St. Joseph (2019)
 Selma University (2019)
 Stratford University (2019)

See also
NCAA Division I men's basketball alignment history
List of defunct college baseball teams
List of defunct college football teams
List of defunct college hockey teams
List of NCAA Division I schools that have never sponsored football

References

College basketball in the United States lists
College Basketball
+